The Pahute Peak Wilderness is a U S Wilderness Area in Nevada under the Bureau of Land Management. It is located in the central Black Rock Range west of the Black Rock Desert Wilderness.

See also 
Black Rock Desert-High Rock Canyon Emigrant Trails National Conservation Area

References

External links 
Pahute Peak Wilderness - Wilderness Connect

Wilderness areas of Nevada
Protected areas of Humboldt County, Nevada
IUCN Category Ib
Bureau of Land Management areas in Nevada